AS/NZS 3112 is the harmonised Australian and New Zealand standard for AC power plugs (male) and sockets (female). The standard is used in Australia, Argentina, New Zealand, Fiji, Tonga, Solomon Islands, Papua New Guinea and several other Pacific island countries. The International Electrotechnical Commission (IEC) "world plugs" Web site calls this plug Type I.

The plug consists of two flat pins forming an inverted V-shape, plus a vertical earthing pin below them. Double insulated appliances omit the earth pin. When viewing a plug from the rear, and the earth pin downwards, the top left pin is active and the top right pin is neutral. The shank of the active and neutral pins of every 10 amp and 15 amp flat-pin plug sold after 3 April 2005 are required to be insulated, in accordance with AS/NZS 3112:2000.

(Note that, in a single phase installation in Australia/New Zealand, the "Line" or "Phase" connection is referred to as the "Active" connection.)

Since 2000, the nominal voltage in most areas of Australia has been 230 V, except for Western Australia and Queensland which both remain at 240 V, though Queensland is transitioning to 230 V. The voltage in New Zealand is also 230 V. In Fiji, Tonga and Papua New Guinea it is 240 V, and in the Solomon Islands it is 220 V. The standards of China and Argentina also use the type I plug and socket, though the live (active) and neutral pins are reversed in Argentina, and the plugs and sockets in China are fitted with earth upper most and live on the right. In both countries the voltage is 220 V. Differences in voltage may give rise to compatibility issues, especially for travellers and those purchasing appliances overseas or online. Most 230V equipment will work with voltages from 220-240 without issues but connecting a 110 volt appliance to a 230 volt outlet can damage the appliance. Voltage adapters using a transformer may be required to overcome the problem. The mains frequency is 50 Hz in all these countries.

Description 

AS/NZS 3112 compliant plugs have two flat pins forming an inverted V-shape plus a vertical earthing pin.

A standard socket-outlet provides a nominal voltage of 230 volts RMS at a maximum of 10 amps and always includes an earth connection. "Shuttered" socket-outlets are available, but these are not required by regulation.

There are unearthed versions of the plug used with this outlet having only the two flat inverted V-aligned pins, without the earthing pin. Such plugs are only to be used for devices where other safety standards are in use (e.g. double insulation) and these plugs are rated at a maximum of only 7.5 amps. They are not available separately but only integrally with power cords specifically designed for the purpose.

A view of the wiring side of a typical dual socket-outlet is also shown on the right, together with an annotated view of the mechanism, without the front cover. (One "rocker" switch has been disassembled to show its operation.)

If required, such dual socket-outlets can be obtained (at additional cost) using insulation displacement as a means of connecting to the supply conductors, as can be seen in the illustration - below right. The benefits claimed for their use in these applications include up to 50% faster installation, due to the reduction in the stripping, twisting and screwing down processes.

Switch requirements

Regulations require socket-outlets to be "individually controlled by a separate switch that .... operates in all active conductors", subject to three "exceptions":

 "A single switch may be used for the control of two socket-outlets located immediately adjacent to each other". (subject to the current rating of the switch to be at least equal to the (a) total current rating of the sockets concerned; or (b) the current rating of the overcurrent protection device concerned, whichever is the lesser value.)
 "A socket-outlet that is switched by the insertion and withdrawal of the plug shall be deemed to meet the requirements ....”  (Such a socket-outlet and the mechanism used is shown on the left.)
 ”A socket-outlet that is rated at not more than 10 A, installed for the connection of a fixed or stationary appliance or a luminaire and that is not readily accessible for other purposes, need not be controlled by a switch". (Such a socket-outlet and plug, installed in a ceiling space, is shown below to the right.)

However, "stationary appliances" (such as fans) and most "luminaires" may be controlled by a remote switch, which would switch the supply via the socket-outlet concerned. Exceptions could be devices such as illuminated "Exit" signs, which require connection to the power supply at all times.

Each switch or means of operating a switch, for a socket-outlet shall be (a) as close as practicable to the socket-outlet, and (b) marked to indicate the socket-outlet(s) or the connected electrical equipment that it controls, with the exception that marking is not required where the socket-outlet controlled is obvious because of the location of the switch.

Double pole switches are required in caravans and mobile homes:

 All switches installed in transportable structures and intended to be connected to the site supply shall operate in all live (active and neutral) conductors."
 Switches that directly control socket-outlets shall comply with the above requirements."

Variants

Standard single phase 230 V domestic socket outlets in Australia and New Zealand are rated at 10 A.

However, for heavier duty applications there are several variants having current ratings of up to 32 A:

 The 15 A outlet has a wider Earth pin than the 10 A outlet.
 The 20 A outlet has a wider Earth pin and wider Line and Neutral pins.
 The 25 A outlet has an inverted "L" shaped Earth pin and wider Line and Neutral pins.
 The 32 A outlet has a sideways "U" shaped Earth pin and wider Line and Neutral pins.

From this it may be seen that any plug can be inserted into a socket outlet of the same or higher rating but cannot be inserted into a socket outlet of lower rating.

Hence, a 10 A plug will fit into all of the five types of socket outlets, a 15 A plug will fit into all except a 10 A (and so on) while a 32 A plug will fit only into a 32 A socket outlet.

In general, only 10 A and 15 A socket outlets are likely to be encountered in domestic or commercial installations.  Higher rated socket outlets are sometimes used for connection of electric ovens in domestic kitchens.  These sockets are rarely seen in industrial environments, where AS/NZS 3123 weather-proof sockets are generally preferred.

A variant of the Australian standard 10 amperes plug has a socket on the back to allow connection of a second appliance to the same outlet. This type of plug is known officially as a "socket adapter plug" but is referred to colloquially, in Australia, as a "piggy-back plug", or in New Zealand, as a "tap-on" plug and is shown below to the right.  In Australia the plug is now available only as part of a pre-assembled extension cord, or by special order.  In New Zealand re-wireable PDL 940 "tap-on" plugs are more widely available.

Other variants include plug/sockets with a rating of 10 A using a round earth pin, which is used on "special use" circuits, such as storage heaters in classrooms; and a 110 V 10 A version that has round active & neutral pins with a flat earth pin.  The latter is rated at only 110 V (since certain [foreign] 110 V plugs could be inserted into the socket-outlet) and may be used on PAR 64 lights, where two 110 volt 1000 watt lamps are used in series.

The active terminal is the first 'socket' from the Earth 'socket' in a clockwise direction when viewing the front of a socket-outlet. Care should be taken if Argentinian standards or faulty wiring swaps the active and neutral pins. Care should also be taken with the 10 A version with the round pin as physically compatible, but electrically incompatible NEMA 7–15 connector used for 277 V 15 A connections is encountered in commercial or industrial settings in the Americas.

While never "codified", since the 1960s it has become "normal" for socket-outlets manufactured for use in Australia/New Zealand to have the Earth pin facing downwards, so that the longer Earth pin will be the last to lose contact if the inserted plug is tugged downwards. Many products such as "side-entry" plugs (with the cord exit in the 5 O'clock/135-degree position) and extra low voltage "plug packs" are manufactured for use in Australia/New Zealand assuming that the socket into which they will be inserted has the Earth pin downwards.

History

Australia's standard plug/socket system was originally codified as standard C112 (floated provisionally in 1937, and adopted as a formal standard in 1938). The Australian standard of 1937 was the result of a "gentlemen's agreement", reportly from 1930, between manufacturers Fred Cook of Ring-Grip, Geoffrey Gerard of Gerard Industries and Brian Harper Miller of the State Electricity Commission of Victoria (SECV). The design was based on an American plug and socket-outlet first intended for use at 120 V which was patented in 1916 under  by Harvey Hubbell. By the early 1930s this design had been up-rated to 250 V 10 Amp capacity and Hubbell had supplied the Australian electrical industry with his sockets. Current Australian plugs fit these American outlets perfectly. (While this socket-outlet never became a NEMA standard design, the 50 A NEMA 10-50R, has a similar pin configuration in a larger form.) Argentina, Uruguay and China based their plugs and sockets on the same design. New Zealand also adopted the Australian design, since Australian equipment and many electrical appliances were exported to that country.

One of the reasons behind the adoption of that particular design was that it was cheap to make, with the flat pins being able to be easily stamped out of sheet brass, in contrast to round pins or thicker rectangular ones used in other countries. This was also a consideration when the Chinese authorities officially adopted the design in relatively recent times, despite the considerable inroads the British plug had made, because of its use in Hong Kong. The Chinese socket is normally mounted with the earth pin at the top. This is considered to offer some protection should a conductive object fall between the plug and the socket. The Chinese CPCS-CCC (Chinese 10 A/250 V) plugs and socket-outlets are almost identical, differing by only  longer pins and installed "upside down". Though AS 3112 plugs will physically connect, they may not be electrically compatible to the Chinese 220 V standards. Originally there was no convention as to the direction of the earth pin. Often it was facing upwards, as socket-outlets in China now do but it could also be downwards or horizontal, in either direction.

In Australia, the C112 standard was superseded by AS 3112 in 1990. A major update was released in 2000 as AS/NZS 3112:2000, which mandated active and neutral insulated pins on the plugs sold for use with these socket-outlets after 3 April 2005, which somewhat negates any 'advantage' of having the earth pin uppermost. The standard AS/NZS 3112:2004 introduced more stringent testing procedures to test for bending of the pins and subtle changes to the radius of the pin tips. The current version is AS/NZS 3112:2011, Approval and test specification—Plugs and socket-outlets.

Voltage
In 1980, the International Electrotechnical Commission (IEC) rationalised the 220 V, 230 V and 240 V nominal voltage levels around the world to a consistent 230 V. This rationalisation was ostensibly made to improve the economics of making appliances by allowing manufacturers to produce a range of items with a rated voltage of 230 V. Not all countries have yet converted to the new standard.

The nominal voltage in most areas of Australia had been set at 240 V in 1926. In 2000, Standards Australia issued a system Standard AS60038, with 230 V as the nominal voltage with a +10% to –6% variation at the point of supply, i.e., 253 V to 216.2 V. A new power quality standard, AS61000.3.100, was released in 2011 that details additional requirements. The new standard stipulates a nominal 230 V, and the allowable voltage to the customer's point of supply is, as mentioned, +10% to –6%. However, the preferred operating range is +6% to –2%. (244 V to 225 V).

In Australia, the actual voltages delivered to customers is set at the state/territory level. As of 2022, all states/territories have transitioned to 230 V standards. Queensland began the transition to 230 V in 2017. The reason given for Queensland's decision to move was the increased use of grid-tied rooftop solar installations raising the grid voltage. By lowering the voltage to 230 V, additional headroom of 960 megawatts was created to accommodate future residential power generation from rooftop solar.

The voltage in New Zealand is also 230 V. In Fiji, Tonga and Papua New Guinea it is 240 V. In China, the Solomon Islands and Argentina the voltage is 220 V.

Brazil
In Brazil, this kind of plug is commonly found in high-power appliances like air conditioners, dishwashers, and household ovens. The reasons why they have been unofficially adopted for this use may be the robustness and high-current bearing capabilities, the impossibility of inverting phase (active) and neutral pins, or the fact that Argentina, a border country, uses this plug and used to be more developed than Brazil in the past so there may have been a flux of high-powered appliances from Argentina to Brazil at some point in time.

Nowadays, Brazil has adopted the national standard NBR 14136, which is loosely based on the IEC 60906-1 standard.  NBR 14136 defines two types of socket-outlets and plugs: one for 10 A, with a  pin diameter, and another for 20 A, with a  pin diameter. New apparatus has been sold with the new plug, so the tendency is the usage of the "Australian" plug to fade away.

References

External links

 Electrical Power Connector Overview in Australia

Mains power connectors
Standards of Australia and New Zealand